The Leven Lever was a newspaper published in Ulverstone, Tasmania, from 1919-1920.

History
The Leven Lever was published weekly. The first edition was published on 14 June 1919 and the newspaper ran until its last edition on 11 December 1920. It was a free community newspaper distributed in the Ulverstone, formerly Leven, Tasmania, municipality on the north west coast of Tasmania.

Digitisation
This paper has been digitised as part of the Australian Newspapers Digitisation Program of the National Library of Australia.

See also
 List of newspapers in Australia

References

External links
 

1919 establishments in Australia
Newspapers established in 1919
Defunct newspapers published in Tasmania
Newspapers on Trove
Ulverstone, Tasmania